Francisco "Frankie" Chévere Mouriño was an attorney and the Executive Director of the Puerto Rico Trade and Export Company. Before his appointment at the Company, Chévere was a renowned lawyer in labor law. He was also an active participant in the Popular Democratic Party where he was a former candidate for mayor of Guaynabo and the biggest fundraiser for the gubernatorial campaign of Alejandro García Padilla, the governor of Puerto Rico.  He is the CEO-Executive Director at Catholic Charities of the Diocese of Palm Beach, Inc. He has a Bachelor in Arts from Georgetown University, a juris doctor degree from the University of Pennsylvania Law School and participated in a one-year study abroad GY-Program taking Masters-level courses in economics and political science at the University of Sussex.

References

Attorneys from Ponce
Political office-holders in Puerto Rico
Georgetown University alumni
Living people
Year of birth missing (living people)
Puerto Rican lawyers
Puerto Rican Roman Catholics
University of Pennsylvania Law School alumni